Cataloipus is a genus of grasshopper in the family Acrididae.

Species 
 Cataloipus abyssinicus Uvarov 1921
 Cataloipus ambiguus (Stål, 1876)
 Cataloipus brunneri (Kirby, W.F. 1910)
 Cataloipus cognatus (Walker, F., 1870)
 Cataloipus cymbiferus (Krauss 1877)
 Cataloipus fuscocoeruleipes Sjöstedt, 1923
 Cataloipus gigas Ramme, 1929
 Cataloipus himalayensis Singh, A.K. & Tandon 1978
 Cataloipus indicus Uvarov 1942
 Cataloipus klaptoczi Karny, 1917
 Cataloipus oberthuri (Bolívar, I., 1890)
 Cataloipus pulcher Sjöstedt, 1929
 Cataloipus roseipennis Uvarov 1921
 Cataloipus thomasi Uvarov 1933
 Cataloipus zuluensis Sjöstedt, 1929

References

External links 
 
 

Acrididae genera
Taxa named by Ignacio Bolívar